I See What You Mean, also known as the "Big Blue Bear", is a 40-foot-tall sculpture of a blue bear by Lawrence Argent, installed outside the Colorado Convention Center, in Denver. The piece was installed at a cost of US$424,400, and was immediately popular with both the public and art community.

References

Animal sculptures in the United States
Outdoor sculptures in Denver
Sculptures of bears
Statues in Colorado